Kąkowa Wola-Parcele  is a village in the administrative district of Gmina Brześć Kujawski, within Włocławek County, Kuyavian-Pomeranian Voivodeship, in north-central Poland.

References

Villages in Włocławek County